Inala can refer to:
 Inala, Queensland, a place in Brisbane
 Electoral district of Inala, Queensland, Australia
 Inala, a 1985 album by the South African chorus Ladysmith Black Mambazo